Misawa (written: 三沢 or 三澤) may refer to:

Surname
 Mitsuharu Misawa (1962–2009), Japanese professional wrestler
 Junichi Misawa (born 1985), Japanese footballer
 Keiichi Misawa (born 1988), Japanese footballer
 Koichi Misawa (born 1974), Japanese baseball player
, Japanese ice hockey player
 Sachika Misawa, Japanese voice actress and singer
, Japanese ice hockey player
 Shin Misawa, Japanese anime director and storyboard artist
 Teruo Misawa, Japanese boxer

Fictional characters
 Bastion Misawa (Daichi Misawa) in Yu-Gi-Oh! GX
 Maho Misawa in Ro-Kyu-Bu!

Places
 Misawa, Aomori, a city located along the far North Pacific coastline of mainland Japan
 Misawa Station, a railway station of Misawa, Aomori
 Misawa Air Base, an American as well as a Japanese airbase
 Misawa Airport

Japanese-language surnames